Spider Girl (Sussa Paka) is a fictional character appearing in books published by DC Comics. The character was first mentioned as a concept in the letters page of Adventure Comics when a fan suggested a character with the power of super-strong prehensile hair.

Fictional character biography
Spider Girl formally first appeared as a failed Legion of Super-Heroes applicant.

She went on to join Tarik the Mute's underground academy for supervillains and later the Legion of Super-Villains.

Pre-Zero Hour biography

Five Year Gap
During the Five-Year Gap run in Legion of Super-Heroes (vol. 4) (1989), Paka was written as a half-reformed thief with a crush on Legionnaire Ultra Boy.

She joined the adult Legion as Spider Girl, but when the team was outlawed by the United Planets, they went underground, changing their appearances and codenames, even wearing masks. In this storyline, occurring just prior to the Zero Hour reboot of the titles, Sussa changed her codename to Wave and dyed her hair blue.

Post-Zero Hour biography
Spider Girl's first appearance after the Zero Hour event occurred in Legion of Super-Heroes (vol. 4) #64 as a member of the Workforce. She had a relationship with Ultra Boy while he was also a member of the team. As a result of this she was extremely resentful of Apparition.

Superman and the Legion of Super-Heroes
What appears to be a revamped version of the pre-Crisis Spider Girl appears in the Superman and the Legion of Super-Heroes story beginning in Action Comics #858. In this version, she is a member of the "Justice League of Earth", a group of Earth-born Legion rejects which has seized control of Earth and banished the Legion and other extraterrestrials by spreading lies that Superman was a human that hated all aliens.

Powers and abilities

In both incarnations, Spider Girl possesses prehensile hair. She can use her hair to ensnare or bind her opponents. As Wave, her hair was bluish; as Spider Girl, her hair was reddish.

In other media
Spider Girl as Wave appears in the animated series Legion of Super Heroes as a member of the Light Speed Vanguard (Legion of Super-Villains).

References

External links
 Legion Online Biography
 Pre–Zero Hour Unofficial Biography
 Post–Zero Hour Unofficial Biography
 Hero History: Wave

Characters created by Jerry Siegel
Characters created by John Forte
Comics characters introduced in 1963
DC Comics metahumans
DC Comics female superheroes
DC Comics female supervillains